Laura Pausini is the debut album by Italian singer Laura Pausini. It was released in Italy on 18 May 1993 by CGD Records (Warner).

Following the success obtained in Italy, where it sold 400,000 copies, the album was later released in Europe, Australia and Japan. The worldwide sales for the album exceed two million copies.

The first single from the album, "La solitudine", was the winner of the 43rd Sanremo Music Festival in the newcomer artists' section. It reached the top spot in the Italian Singles Chart and later became an Italian standard and an international hit, reaching the charts in different European countries, including Belgium, the Netherlands and France.

Track listing

Charts

Certifications

References 

1993 debut albums
Laura Pausini albums
Italian-language albums